God's Acre Cemetery is a heritage-listed cemetery in front of Archerfield Airport, along Beatty Road, between Kerry & Mortimer Roads, Archerfield, Brisbane, Queensland, Australia.  It is also known as Grenier's Burial Ground, Coopers Plains Cemetery and Oxley Cemetery.

History

God's Acre Cemetery was established in 1859 by Thomas Grenier as a burial place when his son Volney Grenier, aged 16, was killed in a fall from his horse. Yeerongpilly Shire Council took control of the cemetery in 1924, and subsequently Brisbane City Council in 1925. The cemetery was surrounded by the Archerfield Airport from the late 1920s. The Federal Airports Corporation now owns the land, but is leased by the Brisbane City Council.

God's Acre Cemetery is listed on the Brisbane Heritage Register.

References

External links

Gods Acre Cemetery Monument Australia
Photos of headstones in the cemetery
BillionGraves

Cemeteries in Brisbane
1859 establishments in Australia
1980 disestablishments in Australia
Brisbane Local Heritage Register
Archerfield, Queensland
Cemeteries established in the 1850s